The Stone Guest is a poetic drama by Alexander Pushkin based on the Spanish legend of Don Juan, spelled Don Guan by Pushkin.

History
Pushkin wrote The Stone Guest in 1830 as part of a collection of four short plays known as Little Tragedies. The play is based on the familiar Don Juan legend, but while most traditional adaptations present it as farcical and comedic, Pushkin's "little tragedy" is indeed a romantic tragedy. Save for the duel, there is little action, and though written in the form of a play, scholars agree that it was never meant for the stage.

Pushkin wrote the play after seeing the premiere of a Russian-language version of Mozart's 1787 opera Don Giovanni. He borrowed certain elements from da Ponte's libretto, but made the story his own, focusing more on the tragic romantic elements than on the farcical ones.

Synopsis
Don Juan, illegally returned from exile for having murdered Commander de Salva, seduces the latter's widow, Doña Ana, when she visits the grave of her late husband. Doña Ana agrees to let him visit her home. Don Juan arrogantly invites the grave statue of the Commander to stand watch. When Juan and Ana are together, they hear the stone steps of the Commander. The statue offers a hand to Don Juan, he boldly takes it, and they both descend below the stage.

Influence
Alexander Dargomyzhsky adapted the play into an opera,  The Stone Guest, in 1872. In 2012 the English composer Philip Godfrey adapted the play into an operetta, also called The Stone Guest.

The phrases "Commander's steps" or "steps of the Commander" have become winged words in Russian culture in reference to an approach of a sinister fate. Alexander Blok wrote a poem in 1912 titled Commander's Steps (Шаги Командора). Venedikt Erofeev subtitled his final completed work  Walpurgis Night "the Steps of the Commander."

References

 Alexander Pushkin: A Critical Study by A.D.P. Briggs, Rowman & Littlefield Publishers, 1982.

1830 plays
Plays by Aleksandr Pushkin
Plays adapted into operas
Works based on the Don Juan legend
Fantasy theatre